Wusakile is a constituency of the National Assembly of Zambia. It covers the southern part of Kitwe and a rural area to the south of the city in Kitwe District of Copperbelt Province.

List of MPs

References

Constituencies of the National Assembly of Zambia
1968 establishments in Zambia
Constituencies established in 1968